Linwood Barclay (born 1955) is an American-born Canadian author, noted as a novelist, humorist, and (former) columnist. His popular detective novels are bestsellers in Canada and internationally, beginning with No Time for Goodbye in 2007.

Biography

Linwood Barclay was born in Darien, Connecticut, son of Muriel and Everett Barclay. His father was a professional illustrator who moved his family to Canada in 1959 where he had accepted a job with William R. Templeton Studios in Toronto. In 1966 the family purchased a vacation campground in Bobcaygeon, Ontario, which they ran for about five years until his father died from lung cancer when Barclay was sixteen.

Barclay recognized his interest in writing detective fiction at an early age, inspired by the works of Ross Macdonald, who had grown up in Kitchener, Ontario. After graduating from high school Barclay studied literature at Trent University in Peterborough, Ontario, where one of his teachers was the noted novelist Margaret Laurence. While attending university, he began a correspondence with Macdonald that proved inspirational for Barclay. They met once, at which time Macdonald inscribed one of his books to Barclay: "For Linwood, who will, I hope, someday outwrite me".

After graduation with an English literature degree from Trent, he could not sell any of his novels so he found work on a number of local newspapers beginning with the Peterborough Examiner. He subsequently moved to the Toronto Star in 1981. In 1993, following the death of Gary Lautens, he began to write a thrice-weekly humour column for the paper. He also released podcasts of his articles and published three collections: Mike Harris Made Me Eat My Dog, Father Knows Zilch: A Guide for Dumbfounded Dads, and This House Is Nuts!. Between 2004 and 2007, while still writing his column, he published four mystery/comedies, all featuring a sleuth named Zack Walker who works as a newspaper columnist by day. The books were published in the United Kingdom and were modestly successful.

His break came in 2007 when he published No Time for Goodbye. A runaway bestseller in the UK, it quickly sold a million copies there and elsewhere. He took a one-year sabbatical to promote his novel and he had planned to return to the Star in September 2008. But on June 28, 2008, he wrote his last column, announcing his retirement from the newspaper. His 2012 novel Trust Your Eyes was a finalist for the Crime Thriller Book Club Best Read from the UK Specsavers Crime Thriller Awards. At the time of its publication, it was announced that Trust Your Eyes had been optioned by a Hollywood studio. Barclay made the cover of Variety Magazine because of the bidding war it had caused between Universal Studios and Warner Bros.

Barclay lives in Oakville, Ontario, with his wife of more than three decades, Neetha, with whom he has two children - Spencer and Paige.

Bibliography

Non-fiction
Last Resort: A Memoir (2000, finalist for the Stephen Leacock Medal for Humour)

Humour
 Mike Harris Made Me Eat My Dog
Father Knows Zilch: A Guide for Dumbfounded Dads
This House Is Nuts! : Surviving the Absurdities of Everyday Life

Fiction

References

External links
Columns, Toronto Star
Official website

21st-century Canadian novelists
Canadian crime fiction writers
Canadian humour columnists
Canadian male novelists
Canadian mystery writers
Living people
1955 births
21st-century Canadian male writers
Canadian thriller writers
Thriller writers
Canadian male non-fiction writers